Richard Whitelegh (fl. 1362–1394) of Osborn Newton in Churchstow, Devon, was an English politician.

He was a Member (MP) of the Parliament of England for Totnes in 1362 and 1394, and for Dartmouth in 1368 and 1386.

References

Year of birth missing
Year of death missing
English MPs 1362
High Sheriffs of Devon
English MPs 1394
English MPs 1368
English MPs 1386
Members of the Parliament of England (pre-1707) for Totnes
Members of the Parliament of England for Dartmouth